Rolf Maurer (16 April 1938 – 6 June 2019) was a Swiss road racing cyclist who competed professionally between 1960 and 1969. In 1964, he won Tour de Suisse and Tour de Romandie.

Major results

1960
 5th Tour du Nord-Ouest
1961
 1st Züri-Metzgete
1962
 2nd Tour du Nord-Ouest
 10th Overall Tour de Suisse
1963
 1st Stage 4 Tour de Romandie
 2nd Overall Tour de Suisse
 2nd Overall Tour de l'Avenir
1st Stage 12
 3rd Tour du Nord-Ouest
1964
 1st  Overall Tour de Suisse
1st Stages 2 & 3 (ITT)
 1st  Overall Tour de Romandie
 9th Overall Giro d'Italia
1st Stage 10
 10th Züri-Metzgete
1965
 2nd Overall Tour de Romandie
 3rd Tour des Quatre-Cantons
1966
 3rd Overall Tirreno–Adriatico
1st Stage 1
 3rd Overall Tour de Romandie
 5th Gran Piemonte
 6th Overall Tour de Suisse
 6th Milan–San Remo
 7th Giro di Toscana
 10th Overall Giro d'Italia
1967
 2nd Overall Tour de Suisse
 9th A Travers Lausanne
1968
 1st Tour des Quatre-Cantons
 6th Milan–San Remo
 9th Overall Tour de Suisse
1st Stage 5

References

External links

1938 births
2019 deaths
Swiss male cyclists
People from Affoltern District
Tour de Suisse stage winners
Swiss Giro d'Italia stage winners
Sportspeople from the canton of Zürich